Électronique Noire is an album by Norwegian guitarist Eivind Aarset.

Background 
This is a ground breaking debut solo album, and whether collaborating with trumpeter Nils Petter Molvaer or recording for Bugge Wesseltoft's Jazzland label, Eivind Aarset remains a highly treasured ambasadour of the Norwegian jazz scene. Électronique noire was rated "one of the best electric jazz albums of the post-Miles era" by no less than The New York Times. Melting jazz and electronic music into the most unexpected alloys, incorporating Aarsets unstoppable creativity and very personal sound, the result is an appreciably hearable album.

Reception
The AllMusic review awarded the album 4 stars, and the reviewer Beate Nossum of the Norwegian newspaper Dagbladet awarded the album dice 3.

Track listing
«Dark Moisture» (7:50) Trumpet – Nils Petter Molvær Bass – Ingebrigt Håker Flaten Drums – Anders Engen Electric piano (Rhodes) – Bugge Wesseltoft Mixing (Mix) – Ulf W.Ø. Holand Recording (bass & drums) – Truls Birkeland Recording (Rhodes) – Bugge Wesseltoft Recorded By (trumpet) – Giert Clausen
«Entrance / U-Bahn» (8:33) Voice (distorted shouting) – Nils Petter Molvær Bass – Jonny Sjo Bass clarinet (additional), soprano saxophone – Vidar Johansen Synthesizer – Kjetil Bjerkestrand Drums – Kim Ofstad Edition – Bugge Wesseltoft & Eivind Aarset Recording – Kaj Hjertenes & Per Ravnaas Recording (bassclarinet, sax), mixing – Ulf W.Ø. Holand
«Lost And Found» (7:32) Drums – Kim Ofstad Synthesizer, Recording (synthesizer) – Kjetil Bjerkestrand Mixing – Bernhard Löhr
«Superstrings» (8:26) Trumpet – Nils Petter Molvær Bass – Jonny Sjo Drums – Kim Ofstad Edited By, Arranged By – Eivind Aarset Mixing, edition, arranging – Bugge Wesseltoft Recording (bass & drums) – Truls Birkeland Recording (trumpet) – Giert Clausen
«Électronique Noire» (3:53) Drums – Kim Ofstad Mixed By – Bernhard Löhr Recording (dissonant chords) – Bugge Wesseltoft Sounds (dissonant chords), inputs arrangements – Bugge Wesseltoft
«Wake-Up Call» (6:36) Drums – Kim Ofstad Mixing – Bernhard Löhr Recording (dissonant chords) – Bugge Wesseltoft Sounds (dissonant chords), inputs arranging – Bugge Wesseltoft
«Namib» (3:00) Composition – Eivind Aarset & Kjetil Saunes Synthesizer, sampler, recording (synthesizer), sampler, mixing, programming – Kjetil Saunes
«Spooky Danish Waltz» (7:06) Bass – Bjørn Kjellemyr Drums – Anders Engen & Kim Ofstad Mixing – Ulf W.Ø. Holand Recording (bass) – Giert Clausen Recording (drums) – Truls Birkeland Synthesizer, recording (synthesizer) – Kjetil Bjerkestrand
«Porcupine Night Walk» (6:40) Bass – Ingebrigt Håker Flaten Drums – Anders Engen Mixed By – Bernhard Löhr Recording (bass & drums) – Truls Birkeland

Credits
Arrangements – Eivind Aarset (tracks: 1–3 & 5–9)
Compositions – Eivind Aarset (tracks: 1–6, 8 & 9)
Cover design – Tina Jørgensen
Guitar (straight, treated, e-bowed, looped, ugly, pretty], programming, sampler, bass, producer – Eivind Aarset
Mastering – Bernhard Löhr
Photography – Mats H. Ljungberg
Recording – Eivind Aarset (tracks: 1, 3–9)

Notes
Most of the compositions on this album is based on the commission work "7" for Maijazz 97
"Lost And Found" inspired by Bendik Hofseth
"Dark Moisture" mix in Lydlab, bass and drums recorded in Studio 1, trumpet recorded in Fersk Lyd, Rhodes recorded in Bugge's Room
"Entrance / U-Bahn" recorded live at Maijazz 97 in Stavanger for NRK, bassclarinet, sax recording and mix in Lydlab
"Lost And Found" mix in Mono Music Studio, synthesizer recorded in Dr. Kills Laboratorium
"Superstrings" mix in Bugge's Room, bass & drums recorded in Studio 1, trumpet recorded in Fersk Lyd
"Électronique Noire" and "Wake-Up Call" mix in Mono Music Studio, disonant chords recorded in Bugge's Room
"Namib" mix, programming, synthesizer and sampler recording in Pilfabrikken
"Spooky Danish Waltz" mix in Lydlab, drums recorded in Studio 1, bass recorded in Fersk Lyd, synthesizer recorded in Dr. Kills Laboratorium
"Porcupine Night Walk" mix in Mono Music Studio, drums and bass recorded in Studio 1
Mastered in Polar Studio

References

External links
Eivind Aarset Official Website

Eivind Aarset albums
1998 albums